Nathangelo Alexandro Markelo (born 7 January 1999) is a professional footballer who plays as a midfielder for Eredivisie club Excelsior. Born in the Netherlands, he plays for the Curaçao national team.

Club career
Born in Groningen, Markelo was signed by English club Everton in 2017 after being scouted playing in a youth tournament for FC Volendam. He moved on loan to FC Twente in July 2020.

He signed for Jong PSV in August 2021 on a permanent deal.

On 9 July 2022, Markelo joined Excelsior on a three-year contract.

International career
Born in the Netherlands, Markelo is of Curaçao and Surinamese descent. He has represented the Netherlands are various youth international levels. He debuted with the Curaçao national team in a friendly 3–2 loss to Indonesia on 25 September 2022.

Personal life
His younger brother Jahnoah Markelo is also a footballer.

Honours 
Everton U23s

 Premier League Cup: 2018–19

References

1999 births
Living people
Curaçao footballers
Curaçao international footballers
Dutch footballers
Netherlands youth international footballers
Netherlands under-21 international footballers
Curaçao people of Surinamese descent
Dutch people of Curaçao descent
Dutch sportspeople of Surinamese descent
Association football midfielders
FC Volendam players
Everton F.C. players
FC Twente players
Jong PSV players
Excelsior Rotterdam players
Eredivisie players
Eerste Divisie players
Dutch expatriate footballers
Expatriate footballers in the Netherlands
Dutch expatriate sportspeople in England